Homeland: Iraq Year Zero is a 2015 documentary film written and directed by the Iraqi-French film director Abbas Fahdel.

Synopsis
Chronicles of everyday life in Iraq before and after the U.S. invasion.

Awards
 Sesterce d'Or (Best Feature Film Award - International Competition), Festival Visions du réel, 2015 
 Doc Alliance Selection Award, Locarno International Film Festival, 2015
 White Goose Award (Best Feature Film Award - International Competition), DMZ International Documentary Film Festival, 2015.
 Award of Excellence (International Competition), and Citizens' Prize, Yamagata International Documentary Film Festival, 2015.
 Grand Prize and People's Choice Award, RIDM (Rencontres Internationales du Documentaire de Montréal), 2015.
 Silver Tanit, Carthage Film Festival, 2015.
 Jury Prize, Milano Filmmaker Festival, 2015.
 Public Award, Festival Internacional de Cine UNAM (FICUNAM), Mexico, 2016.

See also

Cinema of Iraq
Iraqi culture

References

External links
 
 Official website
 Trailer 
 Interview with Abbas Fahdel

2015 films
Iraqi documentary films
Documentary films about Iraq
Films directed by Abbas Fahdel
2015 documentary films